Oblique muscle of abdomen may refer to:

 Abdominal external oblique muscle
 Abdominal internal oblique muscle